Crivitz is an Amt in the Ludwigslust-Parchim district, in Mecklenburg-Vorpommern, Germany. The seat of the Amt is in Crivitz.

The Amt Crivitz consists of the following municipalities:

 Crivitz zone
Barnin
Bülow
Crivitz
Demen
Friedrichsruhe
Tramm
Zapel
 Banzkow zone
Banzkow
Plate
Sukow
 Ostufer Schweriner See zone
Cambs
Dobin am See
Gneven
Langen Brütz
Leezen
Pinnow
Raben Steinfeld

References

Ämter in Mecklenburg-Western Pomerania